The Bahamas competed at the 2011 Pan American Games in Guadalajara, Mexico from 14 to 30 October 2011. The Chef de Mission will be Don Cornish. The Bahamas team consisted of 22 athletes in five sports.

Medalists

Athletics

The Bahamas team will consist of 13 athletes.

Women

Bowling

The Bahamas has received a wildcard to send a women's team.

Women
Individual

Pairs

Boxing

The Bahamas has qualified one boxer.

Men

Swimming

The Bahamas will send a swimming team.

Men

Women

Tennis

The Bahamas received a wildcard to send one male tennis player.

Men

References

Nations at the 2011 Pan American Games
2011
Pan American Games